An Education is a 2009 coming-of-age drama film directed by Lone Scherfig and written by Nick Hornby. It is based on the memoirs of the same name by British journalist Lynn Barber. The film premiered on 18 January 2009 at the Sundance Film Festival and screened at the Toronto International Film Festival on 10 September 2009. The film then showed at the Mill Valley Film Festival before being released in the United Kingdom by Sony Pictures Classics on 30 October 2009, and going into wide release in the United States on 5 February 2010. An Education earned over $26 million in its combined total gross at the box office.

The film garnered various awards and nominations, ranging from recognition of the film itself to Hornby's screenplay and the cast's acting performances, particularly those of Carey Mulligan and Alfred Molina. The film received three Academy Award nominations, but failed to win any. At the 63rd British Academy Film Awards An Education came away with one award from nine nominations. Mulligan was named Best Actress at the British Independent Film Awards, where the film was nominated for a further six awards. An Education received one nomination, Best Actress in a Drama Motion Picture, from the 67th Golden Globe Awards.

Mulligan earned two awards for her performance at the Hollywood Film Festival and Houston Film Critics Society—Breakthrough Actress and Best Actress respectively. An Education won Best Film from both the Sundance Film and Mill Valley Film Festivals, it would later go on to win Best Foreign Film at the Independent Spirit Awards. Four members of the cast were nominated for awards at the London Film Critics' Circle, along with the film and screenplay. Hornby subsequently received eleven more nominations for his work on the screenplay. Mulligan and Peter Sarsgaard both received awards from the Santa Barbara International Film Festival and the Alliance of Women Film Journalists, where they were the recipients of the Best Depiction Of Nudity, Sexuality, or Seduction award. The 16th Screen Actors Guild Awards saw the film's cast earn a nomination for Outstanding Performance by a Cast in a Motion Picture. The film's music, costume, and hair and make-up also earned four nominations among them.


Awards and nominations

References

External links
 

Lists of accolades by film